Thomas James Walsh (June 12, 1859March 2, 1933) was an American lawyer and Democratic Party politician from Helena, Montana who represented Montana in the US Senate from 1913 to 1933. He was initially elected by the state legislature, and from 1918 on by popular vote, in keeping with the requirements of the Seventeenth Amendment to the United States Constitution.

Walsh had a national reputation as a liberal. However, he died before he could serve President-elect Franklin D. Roosevelt, who chose him as his Attorney General.

Background
Walsh was born in Two Rivers, Wisconsin on June 12, 1859, the son of Irish Catholic immigrants, Bridget (Comer) and Felix Walsh; his father was an active Democrat and was elected as a member of the local school board.

Walsh taught school while attending the University of Wisconsin Law School. He graduated in 1884 and was admitted to the bar. He moved to Redfield, Dakota Territory to practice law. In August 1889, he married Elinor McClements (1859–1917). They had a daughter, Genevieve, born in 1890.

Moving to the state capital of Helena, Montana in 1890, Walsh established a law practice that specialized in personal injury cases and cases involving water rights and copper mining.

Career
Walsh became a leader in Democratic Party politics in Helena and attended numerous local, county and state conventions as a delegate. He was defeated in a 1906 election for the United States House of Representatives and a 1910 race for the U.S. Senate.  Walsh was a delegate to the Democratic National Conventions of 1908, 1912, 1916, 1920, 1924, 1928, and 1932. He was the permanent chairman of the 1928 and 1932 conventions.

In 1912, Walsh won a state legislative election for U.S. Senate. He was repeatedly re-elected, and served from 1913 until his death. He emerged as a spokesman for President Woodrow Wilson in the Senate and supported the graduated income tax, farm loans, and women's suffrage.

Walsh managed Wilson's western campaign against Charles Evans Hughes during the 1916 presidential election, and was credited with helping Wilson win a narrow re-election victory. Unlike many Irish Catholics, who did not want the United States to ally with the United Kingdom, Walsh supported Wilson's foreign policy and voted for war against Germany in 1917. In 1919, he supported Wilson's peace plans and the League of Nations.

Walsh ran for reelection in 1918. In a three-way election that included him, former State Representative Oscar M. Lanstrum as the Republican nominee, and US Representative Jeannette Rankin as the National Party nominee, Walsh narrowly won a second term.

When Walsh ran for re-election in 1924 and defeated Republican Frank Bird Linderman by a solid margin. In 1930, Walsh ran for re-election and defeated Albert J. Galen in a landslide.

During his tenure in the Senate, Walsh gained fame for his legal ability in the Judiciary Committee and speaking ability on the floor.

In the 1920s, Walsh headed the Senate investigation into the Teapot Dome scandal that involved top officials of the administration of President Warren G. Harding. He was chairman of the Democratic National Convention in New York in 1924 and in Chicago in 1932. Walsh opposed child labor and supported women's suffrage and, unlike most  other Catholics, Prohibition. On December 18, 1927 Senator Walsh introduced a plan to investigate the country's electric industry.  The investigation done by the Federal Trade Commission would continue through 1935 and eventually result in four of the most important laws governing the electric industry in the 20th century including the breakup of most of the large holding companies that formed during the 1920s.

In 1933, Walsh was nominated for Attorney General by incoming President Franklin Roosevelt. In late February, he secretly married Mina Nieves Perez Chaumont de Truffin.  Less than a week later, he died while en route by train to Washington for Roosevelt's inauguration., allegedly poisoned by his new wife.

His funeral service was held in the Chamber of the United States Senate, and he was interred at Resurrection Cemetery in Helena.

See also

 List of United States Congress members who died in office (1900–49)

References

Further reading
 Bates, J. Leonard (ed.). Tom Walsh in Dakota Territory: Personal Correspondence of Senator Thomas J. Walsh and Elinor C. McClements (1966).
 Bates, J. Leonard. Senator Thomas J. Walsh of Montana: Law and Public Affairs, from TR to FDR. Urbana: University of Illinois Press, 1999.

External links

 "Walsh, Thomas James" at American National Biography Online

1859 births
1933 deaths
American people of Irish descent
Democratic Party United States senators from Montana
Montana Democrats
Montana lawyers
Wisconsin lawyers
Politicians from Helena, Montana
People from Redfield, South Dakota
People from Two Rivers, Wisconsin
Candidates in the 1924 United States presidential election
20th-century American politicians
University of Wisconsin Law School alumni
Educators from Wisconsin
Catholics from Montana